Latady Island is a low ice-covered island off Antarctica, about  long and  wide, lying  south of Charcot Island and west of Alexander Island. An ice-covered feature in this approximate position was seen from the air and described by Sir Hubert Wilkins in 1929, but not recognized as an island or separately mapped. Latady Island was first photographed from the air by the Ronne Antarctic Research Expedition (RARE), 1947–1948, and mapped from these photos by D. Searle of the Falkland Islands Dependencies Survey in 1960. it was named by the UK Antarctic Place-Names Committee for William R. Latady, an aerial photographer and navigator on the RARE flight.

See also 
 Composite Antarctic Gazetteer
 List of Antarctic islands south of 60° S 
 Scientific Committee on Antarctic Research
 Territorial claims in Antarctica

References

Islands of Antarctica